Pavel Purishkin (born 18 July 1988) is an Uzbek football player of Russian descent, who currently plays for Oman Club in the Oman Professional League.

Career

Youth career
Pavel Purishkin is a graduate of the Uzbek top club Pakhtakor Tashkent's academy. Top goalscorer of Uzbek Reserves League in 2007 and part of Uzbekistan national under-17 football team at 2004 AFC U-17 Championship held in Japan.

Club career
Purishkin began his career in 2007 with Shurtan Guzar in Uzbek League.

In 2011 Pavel moved to Kazakhstan First Division where he scored 44 goals in 99 games for Ak Bulak, Spartak Semey, Astana-1964 and CSKA Almaty. In 2013 his goal in promotion playoff helped Spartak Semey achieve a 1-0 win over FC Vostok and win promotion to 2014 Kazakhstan Premier League.

In February 2016, Purishkin signed a one-year contract with Malaysian UiTM FC. In his first official game for the club, Purishkin scored a hat-trick and made an assist in a 4-1 win vs. Sabah FA on 12 February 2016. Purishkin scored his 4th goal in the first 2 games for the new club in a 1-0 away win vs. Perlis FA on 15 February 2016.

After playing in Kazakhstan and Indonesia in 2017 Purishkin continued playing for clubs in Uzbekistan in 2018 and 2019 seasons. In August 2019 Pavel scored a hat-trick in Uzbekistan Cup match against Uzbekistan top division side AGMK after coming in as a substitute in the second half of the game.

Name
Purishkin's last name (Пурышкин in Russian) has multiple ways of being transliterated from its original spelling in the Russian Cyrillic alphabet into the Latin alphabet. Purishkin is the spelling used throughout the player's passport and other official documents. It has also been adopted by FIFA and is the preferred spelling in most English publications (although Puryshkin is also used elsewhere).

Statistics

Club career statistics

Honours

 Kazakhstan First Division Runner-up: 2013
 Uzbekistan First League Runner-up: 2010
 Kazakhstan First Division 3rd Place: 2014

References

External links
 
 

1988 births
Living people
Uzbekistani footballers
Uzbekistani expatriate footballers
Expatriate footballers in Kazakhstan
Expatriate footballers in Malaysia
Expatriate footballers in Indonesia
Association football forwards
Uzbekistani expatriate sportspeople in Kazakhstan
Uzbekistani expatriate sportspeople in Malaysia
Uzbekistani expatriate sportspeople in Indonesia
FC Zhenis Astana players
Uzbekistani people of Russian descent
People from Nukus